Sean Backman (born April 29, 1986) is an American former professional ice hockey player. He most notably played in the American Hockey League (AHL) and with Eisbären Berlin of the Deutsche Eishockey Liga (DEL).

Playing career
Sean Backman played high school hockey at Avon Old Farms in Connecticut. Backman began his junior career playing for the Green Bay Gamblers in the USHL. He went on to play ECAC Hockey for Yale University where he scored 126 points in 122 games during his four-year Yale career. He was selected to the ECAC Second All-Star Team in 2009 and the ECAC First All-Star Team in 2010. He was also selected to the NCAA East Second All-Star Team in 2010. He scored 126 points in 122 games during his four-year Yale career.

Following his successful term playing ECAC Hockey, the undrafted Backman was a free agent for the 2010–11 season. On March 30, 2010, the Dallas Stars organization signed him to a professional contract. He began the 2010–11 AHL season playing for their top farm team - the Texas Stars. On August 8, 2011, Backman signed a one-year two-way deal with the New York Islanders. He is expected to play for the Islanders top farm team, the Bridgeport Sound Tigers of the American Hockey League.

On August 21, 2013, Backman signed a one-year contract to continue in the AHL with the Manchester Monarchs, an affiliate of the Los Angeles Kings.

Backman played four seasons within the Kings AHL affiliates, before he signed his first contract abroad on a one-year deal with German club, Eisbären Berlin, who are also operated by the Los Angeles Kings.

Career statistics

Awards and honors

References

External links

1986 births
Living people
American men's ice hockey forwards
Bridgeport Sound Tigers players
Eisbären Berlin players
Green Bay Gamblers players
Idaho Steelheads (ECHL) players
Ice hockey players from Connecticut
Manchester Monarchs (AHL) players
Ontario Reign (AHL) players
People from Cos Cob, Connecticut
Texas Stars players
Yale Bulldogs men's ice hockey players
Avon Old Farms alumni
AHCA Division I men's ice hockey All-Americans